Julius Kühn-Institut – Bundesforschungsinstitut für Kulturpflanzen (JKI) is the German Federal Research Centre for Cultivated Plants. It is a federal research institute and a higher federal authority divided into 15 specialized institutes. Its objectives, mission and research scope were determined by section 11, paragraph 57 of the 1987 Federal Law on the Protection of Cultivated Plants as subsequently amended.

The JKI was named after the German agricultural scientist Julius Kühn (1825–1910). It was formed in January 2008 when three research centres in the Federal Ministry of Food and Agriculture merged:
 Federal Biological Research Centre for Agriculture and Forestry (BBA),
 Federal Institute for Plant Breeding Research on crops (BAZ) and
 Federal Agricultural Research Centre (FAL) (two institutes)

It has its main office at Quedlinburg and centres at Berlin, Braunschweig, Darmstadt, Dossenheim, Dresden-Pillnitz, Elsdorf, Groß Lüsewitz, Kleinmachnow, Münster and Siebeldingen.

Institutes
 Epidemiology and Pathogen Diagnostics (Quedlinburg and Braunschweig)
 Ecological Chemistry, Plant Analysis and Stored Product Protection (Quedlinburg, Berlin and Kleinmachnow)
 Resistance Research and Stress Tolerance (Quedlinburg)
 Biosafety in Plant Biotechnology (Quedlinburg)
 Breeding Research on Horticultural and Fruit Crops (Quedlinburg and Dresden)
 Breeding Research on Agricultural Crops (Quedlinburg)
 Application Techniques in Plant Protection (Braunschweig)
 Crop and Soil Science (Braunschweig)
 National and International Plant Health (Braunschweig)
 Plant Protection in Field Crops and Grassland (Braunschweig)
 Plant Protection in Horticulture and Forests (Braunschweig and Münster)
 Strategies and Technology Assessment (Berlin and Kleinmachnow)
 Biological Control (Darmstadt)
 Plant Protection in Fruit Crops and Viticulture (Dossenheim, Siebeldingen, Bernkastel-Kues)
 Grapevine Breeding Geilweilerhof (Siebeldingen)
 Experimental station for potato breeding (Groß Lüsewitz)

Notable people
The facility is headed by breeding researcher Frank Ordon. He succeeded the horticultural and phytomedical scientist Georg F. Backhaus, who had previously been head of the Federal Biological Institute in Berlin and Braunschweig since 2002.

 Georg F. Backhaus (born 1955), agricultural scientist
  (1928–2021), phytopathologist and forest scientist 
 Falko Feldmann (born 1959), biologist and phytomedicine specialist
 Gregor Hagedorn (born 1965), botanist
 Johannes Hallmann (born 1964), agricultural scientist and phytomedicine specialist
  (born 1961), veterinarian, microbiologist and hygienist
 Johannes A. Jehle (born 1961), biologist, insect virologist and phytomedical scientist
  (1887–1960), agronomist and vine grower
  (born 1963), agricultural scientist
 Ewald Schnug (born 1954), agricultural scientist, university lecturer and researcher
 Kornelia Smalla (born 1956), chemist and biotechnologist
  (1923–2018), Professor of Biochemistry
  (born 1946), soil scientist

External links 
 Website

References

Agricultural research institutes in Germany
German federal agencies
Government agencies established in 2008
Organisations based in Saxony-Anhalt
2008 establishments in Germany